Rajiv Tyagi (September 29, 1967 – August 12, 2020) was a leader and spokesperson for Indian National Congress, known for being a prominent figure in news debates. He died on 12 August 2020 in Ghaziabad, shortly after a television appearance; his cause of death was reported variously as either a heart attack or cardiac arrest.

Education and career 
Tyagi had a post-graduate degree in Business administration.

A prominent Youth Congress Party leader, he was appointed the official spokesperson of Congress while serving as the General Secretary at Uttar Pradesh Congress Committee.

Death 
Tyagi was a participant in a TV debate on Hindi news channel Aaj Tak on the issue of 2020 Bangalore riots, when he likely suffered a heart attack. He collapsed just after the debate, following which he was brought to Yashoda Hospital, Ghaziabad, where doctors were unable to revive him.

According to his wife, his last words were 'They killed me,' referring to the TV debate format and Sambit Patra.

References 

1960s births
2020 deaths
People from Ghaziabad, Uttar Pradesh
21st-century Indian politicians
Indian National Congress politicians from Uttar Pradesh